Carlos Gustavo Bossio (born 1 December 1973) is a retired Argentine professional footballer who played as a goalkeeper.

Ironically nicknamed Chiquito ("little") due to his height of 1.94 metres, Bossio represented several teams, but achieved greater notability at Estudiantes and Lanús. He was part of the Argentina national team between 1994 and 1996, winning the golden medal at the 1995 Pan American Games and the silver medal at the 1996 Summer Olympics.

Club career
Born in Córdoba, Bossio started at his home-town club, Las Palmas in 1992. He transferred to the nearby Belgrano de Córdoba in the following year and made his professional debut on 7 November 1993 against Gimnasia y Tiro. Until the end of the season, Bossio appeared in 26 league games. He then moved to the recently relegated, Estudiantes and helped them win the Primera B in the first season. On 12 May 1996, Bossio became the first goalkeeper in Argentine football to score a header, after connecting a corner kick in a match between Estudiantes and Racing Club for the conclusive draw in one goal. Until 1999, he played in 188 games for Estudiantes, 146 for the league.

In June 1999, Bossio, together with Rojas signed with Benfica. However, his breakthrough there was complicated through multiple reasons: he had a strong competitor in Enke; made a serious mistake in a pre-season match with Bayern Munich; and above all, Benfica only began paying Estudiantes in October, so the Argentinians blocked his debut by not releasing him. He made his debut for Benfica on 12 January 2000, in a Portuguese Cup match against Amora, and his league debut arrived on 27 February, leading to an eight-game run as starter that ended on 16 April. Still, in just 8 games, he conceded 14 goals while Enke, in 26 conceded 19 goals. In 2000–01, Bossio remained as back-up to Enke, again enjoying an 8-game run in the league from 31 March until 20 May, conceding 12 goals with Benfica finishing in sixth place. In the following season, Bossio was loaned out to Vitória de Setúbal until 30 June 2002. The 27-year-old commented the deal, saying: "I will certainly be able to show my quality and erase the twisted image that people have of me." He returned to Benfica in the 2002–03 and remained as second choice to another younger goalkeeper, this time, 20-year-old José Moreira. He played six games in two seasons, two of them for the 2003–04 Taça de Portugal, which earned him his first silverware in Portugal.

In June 2004, Bossio mutually terminated his contract with Benfica, and signed with Lanús. He remained their main starter for five seasons, winning the Apertura 2007 with them, their first-ever top league title. In July 2009, Bossio moved to Querétaro in the Liga MX. Two years later, the 37-year-old joined Defensa y Justicia on the Primera B Metropolitana, and retired a year later at third-tier side, Tiro Federal.

International career
Bossio received his first called up for the national team in March 1995, for the 1995 Pan American Games that Argentina won. A year later, he would represent Argentina in the 1996 Summer Olympics, helping them reach the final, but losing it 3–2 to Nigeria.

Honours

Club
Estudiantes
Primera B: 1994–95

Benfica
Taça de Portugal: 2003–04

Lanús
Primera División Argentina: Apertura 2007

International
Argentina
King Fahd Cup: Runner–up 1995
Pan American Games: 1995
Olympic Silver Medal: 1996

References
General
 

Specific

External links
 
 

1973 births
Living people
Footballers from Córdoba, Argentina
Argentine footballers
Argentina international footballers
Argentine expatriate footballers
1995 King Fahd Cup players
1995 Copa América players
Club Atlético Belgrano footballers
Estudiantes de La Plata footballers
S.L. Benfica footballers
Vitória F.C. players
Club Atlético Lanús footballers
Querétaro F.C. footballers
Association football goalkeepers
Footballers at the 1996 Summer Olympics
Olympic footballers of Argentina
Olympic silver medalists for Argentina
Argentine Primera División players
Liga MX players
Primeira Liga players
Expatriate footballers in Mexico
Expatriate footballers in Portugal
Argentine expatriate sportspeople in Mexico
Argentine expatriate sportspeople in Portugal
Olympic medalists in football
Medalists at the 1996 Summer Olympics
Pan American Games gold medalists for Argentina
Pan American Games medalists in football
Footballers at the 1995 Pan American Games
Medalists at the 1995 Pan American Games